Cub Sport are an Australian pop group formed in Brisbane in early 2010. Founding mainstays are Zoe Davis on keyboards, bass guitar, lead guitar and vocals, Tim Nelson on lead vocals and keyboards, Sam "Bolan" Netterfield on keyboards and vocals, and Dan Puusaari on drums. They have released four studio albums, This Is Our Vice (March 2016), Bats (September 2017), Cub Sport (January 2019) and Like Nirvana (July 2020). Like Nirvana is their highest charting release, peaking at No. 2 on the ARIA Albums Chart. Nelson and Netterfield married in August 2018.

History

2010–2013: Early years

Cub Sport were originally formed as Tim Nelson & the Cub Scouts early in 2010 in Brisbane to promote Nelson's solo songs. The original six-piece line-up, was Zoe Davis on bass guitar and vocals, Tim Nelson on vocals and piano, Sam Netterfield on keyboards and vocals, Dan Puusaari on drums, Bek Stoodley on glockenspiel and vocals and Andrew Williams on guitar. Davis, Nelson, Netterfield and Williams had attended the same secondary school, Northside Christian College.

Tim Nelson & the Cub Scouts released a self-titled debut extended play (EP) in August 2010. Mediasearchs Dave Griffiths noticed, "Nelson's amazing voice that sets this group apart from the many other bands... Sweet and blissful this is for those who love the music of Decoder Ring or george." Adam Roberts of Alt Media felt, "as for hooks and chops among the quiet indie set, [Nelson] has all the right ingredients to make something bigger and better." Tiffany Bridger of Rave Magazine praised "Their rainbow of soft, whispery tunes – a fluttering on the glockenspiel, a series of Nelson's emotive keys throughout – make for a magical instrumental arrangement."

Following a line-up change, they shortened their name to Cub Scouts in 2011. They issued two singles — "Evie" in 2011 and "Do You Hear" in 2012; both received high rotation on national youth radio, Triple J. They released their six-track second EP, Told You So in October 2012. theMusic.com.aus Mat Lee observed, "[its] six songs are individual in their own right and the pace is effectively contrasted to highlight the shifts in context and emotion." They supported the EP's release with their second Australian tour. The title track gained popularity on US college radio. Another track, "Do You Hear" won two awards at the 2012 Queensland Music Awards.

The band officially changed their name to Cub Sport in August 2013 following a legal injunction by Scouts Australia. Nelson explained, "We got a cease and desist letter about a month ago asking us to stop using the name." Also in August, they released their five-track third EP, Paradise, which featured two singles: "Pool!" and the title track. On "Pool!" lead vocals were shared by Davis and Nelson. Initial pressings of Paradise still had the Cub Scouts band name, "it's annoying that [the injunction] came up in the middle of us releasing an EP, after we got 1500 copies" pressed. Cub Sport undertook a tour of United States and Europe during 2013.

2014–2018: This Is Our Vice and Bats

Lead guitarist Andrew Williams left Cub Sport in 2014 but was not replaced, they continued as a four-piece, with both Nelson and Davis shifting to additional guitar duties. In October 2015 they released the first single, "Only Friend", from their debut album, This Is Our Vice, which appeared on 4 March 2016. It was produced by John Castle (Megan Washington, Vance Joy) for Nettwerk Records. Jaymz Clements of Rolling Stone (Australia) rated it at two stars and explained, "they fail to fire. It's fine for This Is Our Vice to slew more towards self-reflective, downer territory, but that it relies so heavily on well-tread synth-pop is where it lets itself down." Whereas AllMusic's Neil Z. Yeung gave it three-and-a-half stars and detailed, "With more electronic flourishes and a funkier vibe than their past efforts, the album shimmers, injecting tropical dance elements into its indie rock backbone."

In August 2016, they performed a cover of Kanye West's "Ultralight Beam" on Triple J's programme, Like a Version. The third single, "Come On Mess Me Up", was listed at number 24 on the 2016 Triple J Hottest 100, their first ever appearance in the annual listeners poll. Cub Sport toured nationally and internationally in support of This Is Our Vice, both as head-liners and support act to Ball Park Music, Loon Lake, Andy Bull, Saskwatch, the 1975 and Big Scary. This Is Our Vice was re-released in April 2021, with two bonus tracks, and peaked in the top 60 on the ARIA Albums Chart.

In June 2017 Cub Sport released the first single, "O Lord", from their second album, Bats. The gospel-influenced "O Lord", was written about Nelson's experiences after coming out and his fear of losing his relationship with Netterfield. It was released on 22 September 2017 via MGM Distribution, with Castle and Nelson co-producing, which reached the ARIA Albums Chart top 100. Bats provided two further singles "Chasin'" (August 2017) and "Good Guys Go" (January 2018). Charlotte Saxon of Music Insight caught their performance in Perth in February 2018, "[they are] not afraid to share their most intimate personal stories with fans as they experiment with genres from RnB to pop to gospel. Although their songs are gut wrenching, they are beautiful none the less."

The band toured in support of Bats, including a headlining Australian tour in March 2018, a national support for Vance Joy in September and headlined Aurora Aksnes in October. In August 2018 Nelson and Netterfield were married after campaigning for legalization of same-sex marriage. A video for album track, "Hawaiian Party" was released in September 2018, which was directed and produced by the Dolan Twins. The video surpassed one million views within a week of its upload.

2019–2021: Cub Sport to Like Nirvana

In October 2018 Cub Sport issued the lead single "Sometimes", from their third studio album, Cub Sport. In the following month they were inaugural winners of the ARIA Emerging Artist Scholarship. Cub Sport appeared on 18 January 2019 via the band's own imprint, Cub Sport Records and was distributed by MGM, again. It peaked at number 12 on the ARIA Albums Chart. Also in that month Billboard initiated Billboard Pride to celebrate an LGBTQ act, the inaugural Artist of the Month was Cub Sport. During their Australian tour in April, a live review said that Nelson "is literally like Brisbane's Justin Bieber but more indie and more gay".

Cub Sport released a duet single, "I Never Cried So Much in My Whole Life" (October 2019) featuring Darren Hayes. An article in The Courier-Mail praised the collaboration and referenced Nelson and Netterfield's alma mater; the band were prompted to tweet, "I'd just like to specify that Northside Christian College is a literal homophobic hellscape." In December they issued their fourth EP 333, which provided three singles released weekly over the month. Nelson explained, "333 is made up of three songs that fit together to conjure a feeling of deep and healing euphoria."

Like Nirvana, released on 24 July 2020, was Cub Sport's fourth studio album. Annabel Ross of the Australian edition of NME observed that on their "most stunning LP yet" Nelson describes how "liberation does not deliver permanent bliss, and that self-acceptance is a journey without a final destination." Its lead single, "Confessions", had appeared in March. Like Nirvana peaked at number 2 on the ARIA Albums Chart – their highest placing. In October they covered Powderfinger's "These Days" at the 2020 AFL Grand Final, which was held in Brisbane. During 2021 the group supported vaccinations against COVID-19, "[we] encourage our fans to get vaccinated, to help breathe life back into the music industry so we can come together to experience the magic of live shows again."

2022-present: Jesus at the Gay Bar

In November 2022 Cub Sport released a single, "Replay". According to Nelson, "[It] is about moving forward. Feelings aren't as simple as we sometimes make out – you can long for something and not want it at the same time, you can love something but outgrow it. I think it's about shifting from longing for something to feeling free. But it also doesn't have to be that deep – It's a fun pop song and that's how I want it to be enjoyed too." In January 2023 the group announced their fifth studio album, Jesus at the Gay Bar, which was scheduled for release on 7 April 2023.
Its title references a poem by Jay Hulme.

Band members

Current members
 Zoe Davis – vocals (2010–present), bass (2010–2014, 2017–2018), guitar (2014–present), keyboards (2017–present)
 Tim Nelson – lead vocals (2010–present), keyboards (2010–2018), guitar (2014–2018)
 Sam Netterfield – keyboards, vocals (2010–present)
 Dan Puusaari – drums (2010–present), keyboards (2018–present)

Former members
 Bek Stoodley – backing vocals (2010–2011)
 Andrew Williams – guitar (2010–2014)

Timeline

Discography

Studio albums

Live albums

Extended plays

Singles

Other appearances

Awards

AIR Awards
The Australian Independent Record Awards (commonly known informally as AIR Awards) is an annual awards night to recognise, promote and celebrate the success of Australia's Independent Music sector.

! 
|-
| AIR Awards of 2020
| Cub Sport
| Best Independent Pop Album or EP
| 
| 
|-
| AIR Awards of 2021
| Like Nirvana
| Best Independent Pop Album or EP
| 
|

National Live Music Awards
The National Live Music Awards (NLMAs) are a broad recognition of Australia's diverse live industry, celebrating the success of the Australian live scene. The awards commenced in 2016.

! 
|-
| National Live Music Awards of 2019
| themselves
| Queensland Live Act of the Year
| 
| 
|-
| National Live Music Awards of 2020
| Zoe Davis (Cub Sport)
| Live Instrumentalist of the Year
| 
| 
|-

Queensland Music Awards
The Queensland Music Awards (previously known as Q Song Awards) are annual awards celebrating Queensland, Australia's brightest emerging artists and established legends. They commenced in 2006.

 (wins only)
! 
|-
| rowspan="2" | 2012
| rowspan="2" | "Do You Hear"
| Song of the Year
| 
| rowspan="2" | 
|-
| Pop Song of the Year
| 
|-
| 2017
| Themselves
| The BOQ People's Choice Award for Most Popular Group
| 
| 
|-
|}

References

External links
 

Musical groups from Brisbane
Australian indie pop groups
Australian indie rock groups
Musical groups established in 2010
Nettwerk Music Group artists
2010 establishments in Australia